The Space Engineering EDucation Satellite 2 (SEEDS-2) is a Japanese amateur CubeSat picosatellite, built and operated by Nihon University. It was launched by the Indian Space Research Organisation, aboard a PSLV rocket, on 28 April 2008. It was built to replace the SEEDS satellite, which was lost in a launch failure on a Dnepr rocket in July 2006.

It carries a number of sensors to investigate the environment of space, and its own status. It also contains a voice transmitter, intended to play back messages to amateur radio operators.

See also
AAUSAT-II
COMPASS-1
CUTE-1.7
Delfi-C3
List of CubeSats

References

External links
 SEEDS II web page

Student satellites
Spacecraft launched in 2008
Satellites of Japan
CubeSats
Picosatellites